Zhao Dan (born 14 December 2002) is a Chinese skeleton racer from Horinger County, Hohhot, Inner Mongolia, who served as one of the China's flag-bearers at the 2022 Winter Olympics opening ceremony.

References 

Chinese female skeleton racers
2002 births
Living people
Skeleton racers at the 2022 Winter Olympics
Olympic skeleton racers of China
Skeleton racers at the 2020 Winter Youth Olympics